Thomas Shanks may refer to:
 Tommy Shanks (1880–1919), Irish footballer
 Thomas G. Shanks (born 1942), American time zone history researcher
 Thomas Shanks (politician) (1796–1849), American politician from Virginia

See also
Shanks (disambiguation)